is a Japanese video game producer and president of the game development company, Studio Istolia. He formerly worked at Namco Bandai Studios where he was hired by them before their merge to be primarily involved with the production of the Tales of video games. He joined Namco in 2001. From Tales of Innocence (2007), he was the brand manager and the producer of the Tales of video game series.

On February 21, 2017, Square Enix announced the formation of a new development studio, Studio Istolia, with Baba the president of the studio and producer of its first game Project Prelude Rune. In April 5, 2019 it was announced that Hideo Baba had resigned from Square Enix and Studio Istolia due to a change in management policies.

Games
 Death by Degrees [PS2] (January 27, 2005) — production manager
 Tales of Destiny [PS2] (November 30, 2006) — director
 Tales of Innocence [DS] (December 6, 2007) — producer
 Tales of Destiny - Director's Cut [PS2] (January 31, 2008) — producer
 Tales of Symphonia: Dawn of the New World [Wii] (June 26, 2008) - production supervisor
 Tales of Vesperia [X360] (August 7, 2008) — brand manager
 Eternal Sonata [PS3] (September 18, 2008) — producer
 Tales of Hearts [DS] (December 18, 2008) — producer
 Tales of the World: Radiant Mythology 2 [PSP] (January 29, 2009) — producer
 Tales of VS [PSP] (August 6, 2009) — producer
 Blue Dragon: Awakened Shadow [DS] (October 8, 2009) — producer
 Tales of Graces [Wii] (December 10, 2009) — producer
 Tales of Graces F [PS3] (December 2, 2010) — producer
 Tales of Xillia [PS3] (September 8, 2011) — producer
 Tales of the Heroes: Twin Brave [PSP] (February 2, 2012) — Special Thanks
 Tales of Xillia 2 [PS3] (November 1, 2012) — producer
 Tales of Zestiria [PS3] (2015) — producer
 Project Prelude Rune [PS4] (Cancelled) — producer

References

Bandai Namco Holdings
Japanese video game producers